Frederick W. Baldwin (September 29, 1848 – September 8, 1923) was a Vermont attorney, businessman, historian, author and politician who served as President of the Vermont Senate.

Biography
Frederick Wilton Baldwin was born in Lowell, Vermont on September 29, 1848.  He was the son of Asa and Roselinda Baldwin, and the Baldwins were a family of English origin which had settled in Billerica, Massachusetts before coming to Cavendish, Vermont and then Lowell. Frederick Baldwin was educated at Johnson Academy and Montpelier Seminary, studied law with Philip K. Gleed and H. Henry Powers while teaching school, and was admitted to the bar in 1872.  During the first years of his practice in Barton he was the partner of William W. Grout.

In addition to maintaining a thriving law practice, Baldwin was active in several business ventures, including serving as an officer or director of: The Barton Hotel Company; the Barton Manufacturing Company; the Barton Building Association; and the Barton Bank and Trust Company.

A Republican, Baldwin served as Assistant Secretary of the Vermont Senate from 1872 to 1873, and Senate Secretary from 1874 to 1879.  He was Barton's Superintendent of Schools from 1873 to 1875 and again in 1877.  Baldwin also served as a Village Trustee for 12 years, and was Orleans County State's Attorney from 1880 to 1882.

Baldwin was a member of the Orleans County Republican Committee 1884 to 1892, and was chairman from 1888 to 1890.  He was one of Vermont's presidential electors in 1892, and was the elector deputized to carry Vermont's electoral votes to Washington, D.C. for the official tally.

In 1896 Baldwin served as Barton's member of the Vermont House of Representatives.  In 1900 Baldwin was elected to the Vermont Senate, and was selected as Senate President.

Baldwin was a local historian and published the results of his work, including 1886's Biography of the Bar of Orleans County, Vermont, 1910's History of Bank of Orleans, Irasburgh Bank of Orleans, Barton National Bank, Barton Savings Bank, and Barton Savings Bank & Trust Company, and 1910's The Centennial Celebration of Runaway Pond, Glover, Vermont.

Baldwin died in Barton on September 8, 1923. He was buried at Welcome O. Brown Cemetery in Barton.

Personal
Baldwin was married three times.  His first wife was Susan M. Grout, a sister of General William W. Grout and Governor Josiah Grout.  Frederick and Susan Baldwin had one child, a son named Edward Grout Baldwin.  Susan Grout Baldwin died in 1876, and Frederick Baldwin's second wife was Susan M. Hibbard, who died in 1906. In 1913 he married Jennie Deming Hibbard.

References

1848 births
1923 deaths
American people of English descent
People from Lowell, Vermont
Republican Party members of the Vermont House of Representatives
Republican Party Vermont state senators
Presidents pro tempore of the Vermont Senate
Vermont lawyers
State's attorneys in Vermont
1892 United States presidential electors
Burials in Vermont
19th-century American lawyers